Lady Anne Talbot, Countess of Shrewsbury (c. 1471–1520) was an English noblewoman who served as a lady-in-waiting to Queen consort Catherine of Aragon, the first wife of King Henry VIII of England. Anne was the first wife of George Talbot, 4th Earl of Shrewsbury, by whom she had 11 children. Her maternal half-sister was Cecily Bonville, the wealthiest heiress in late 15th-century England.

Anne was also the Baroness Furnivall, as her husband held the title of 9th Baron Furnivall.

Family and early years
Anne was born in about 1471, the youngest child of William Hastings, 1st Baron Hastings, and Katherine Neville, sister of Richard Neville, 16th Earl of Warwick. Anne had four brothers, Sir Edward Hastings, 2nd Baron Hastings, Sir William, Sir Richard, and George, and a sister, Elizabeth. She had an older half-sister Cecily Bonville from her mother's first marriage to William Bonville, 6th Baron Harington who was executed by the command of Queen Margaret of Anjou after the Battle of Wakefield where he fought on the side of the Yorkists. Cecily was the wealthiest heiress in England as well as the suo jure Baroness Harington and Bonville.

Anne grew up during the period in English history when the dynastic civil wars fought between the Houses of York and Lancaster, known as the Wars of the Roses, broke out at intervals and resulted in the deaths of many combatants and supporters from both sides.

Anne's father was a staunch Yorkist, and a close friend and Lord Chamberlain of King Edward IV. After the latter's death in April 1483, Hastings was persuaded by his mistress Jane Shore to enter into a conspiracy against the late king's youngest brother, Richard, Duke of Gloucester, who had been made Lord Protector of the realm. Upon discovery of Hastings treachery, Gloucester gave the order for  his execution, which was carried out at the Tower of London on 13 June 1483. Anne's father was not attainted, however, and her mother, Katherine was placed under Gloucester's protection following his ascension as King Richard III of England, which secured her privileges and rights.

At the time of her father's execution, Anne was already married to Hastings' teenaged ward. Her mother, by royal permission, took over as legal guardian of Anne's husband until he came of age.

Marriage and issue
Sometime before 27 June 1481, at the age of about 10, Anne married her father's 13-year-old ward, George Talbot, 4th Earl of Shrewsbury, 9th Baron Furnivall. George was her second cousin. She was his first wife, and upon their marriage she was styled as Countess of Shrewsbury and Baroness Furnivall.

Together George and Anne had 11 children:
 Francis Talbot, later 11th Baron Talbot and 5th Earl of Shrewsbury (c. 1500-1560)
 Elizabeth Talbot (c. 1507-aft. 6 May 1552), married aft. 18 May 1519 William Dacre, 3rd Baron Dacre of Gilsland, and had issue.
 Margaret Talbot (dsp.), married, as his first wife, Henry Clifford, 1st Earl of Cumberland
 Mary Talbot (d. 16 April 1572), married c. January 1523/1524, to Henry Percy, 6th Earl of Northumberland.
 Henry Talbot, styled Lord Talbot (d. young)
 John Talbot (d. young)
 John Talbot (d. young)
 William Talbot, Marshal of Ireland
 Richard Talbot
 Anne Talbot
 Dorothy Talbot

At the royal court 

Early in the reign of King Henry VIII of England, Anne came to court where she served as a lady-in-waiting to Queen consort Catherine of Aragon. It is not known how long she served in this capacity.

Death
Anne died on an unknown date in 1520. She was buried in the Church of St. Peter and St. Paul, which is now the Sheffield Cathedral. Her husband married secondly Elizabeth Walden (died July 1567), by whom he had a daughter, Anne (d.18 July 1588).

George Talbot, Earl of Shrewsbury had a chapel added to the church in 1520 to serve as a family chapel; and after his own death, a monument was built in Shrewsbury Chapel where his effigy can be seen flanked by those of Anne and his second wife, Elizabeth.

Ancestry

Footnotes

References

1471 births
1520 deaths
English countesses
Waterford
English ladies-in-waiting
Anne Hastings, Countess of Shrewsbury
Anne Hastings, Countess of Shrewsbury
Daughters of barons
Wives of knights
15th-century English women
16th-century English women
15th-century English people
16th-century English nobility
Hastings
Household of Catherine of Aragon